Eco-warrior may refer to an environmental activist.

It may also refer to:
 Eco Warriors Flag in Australia